Kalkbrenner (German: occupational name for a lime burner) is a German surname. Notable people with the surname include:

Christian Kalkbrenner (1755–1806), German bandmaster or Kapellmeister, violinist, organ and keyboard player, composer and father of Friedrich
Friedrich Kalkbrenner (1785–1849), German pianist, composer, piano teacher and piano manufacturer
Fritz Kalkbrenner (born 1981), German electronic musician, producer and actor, younger brother of Paul Kalkbrenner (born 1977)
Paul Kalkbrenner (born 1977), German electronic musician and actor, older brother of Fritz Kalkbrenner (born 1981)

occupational surnames
German-language surnames